was a Japanese architect. He has a Ph.D. from the University of Tokyo. In 1996, he married the announcer Mikiko Minami, and the couple had a child in the following year.

References

External links 
  

1949 births
2015 deaths
Japanese architects
People from Nagasaki